Lois Jane Hastings, often known as L. Jane Hastings, (born 3 March 1928, in Seattle) is an American architect, a Fellow of the American Institute of Architects and the first woman to serve as chancellor of the AIA College of Fellows. Her architecture firm, the Hastings Group, designed over 500 mostly residential buildings in the Seattle area.

Biography

Born and raised in Seattle, Hastings studied architecture at the University of Washington, the only woman in a class of 200. Graduating in 1952, the following year she became only the eighth woman to be licensed as an architect in the State of Washington. She then spent a couple of years with the U.S. Army in Germany. On returning to Seattle, she worked for a number of architecture firms, gaining experience on a variety of building types including schools, industrial premises, housing, offices and cultural institutions. In 1961, she became independent as "L. Jane Hastings, Architect", establishing an office in the university district. In 1974, she moved to downtown offices creating the "Hastings Group" with a number of other architects including Carolyn Geise and Cynthia Richardson who later established practices of their own. The group completed over 500 mainly residential projects in the Seattle area by 1995. Other commissions included the remodeling of commercial and university facilities, renovations at Sea-Tac Airport, a highway bridge approach and, in 1976, the historic restoration of a Tulapip Indian Tribal building. Projects also included the renovation of the University of Washington's Cunningham Hall in order to serve as the campus's women's center.

From 1969 to 1980, Hastings lectured part-time in Design Studies at the University of Washington and in Architectural Drafting at the Seattle Community College. She was an active member of the American Institute of Architects and the International Union of Women Architects. She became a Fellow of the AIA in 1980 and the first woman chancellor of the AIA College of Fellows in 1992.

Awards

Hastings received the AIA annual "Home of the Month" award in 1968 and the AIA Seattle Medal in 1995. In 2002, she was the first recipient ever to receive the AIA NW & Pacific Region Medal of Honor for "accomplishments over more than four decades of AIA activism".

References

1928 births
20th-century American architects
Architects from Seattle
American women architects
Living people
Fellows of the American Institute of Architects
University of Washington College of Built Environments alumni
20th-century American women
21st-century American women